The 22nd Separate Guards Special Purpose Brigade (22-я отдельная гвардейская бригада специального назначения) is a special forces (spetsnaz) brigade of the Armed Forces of the Russian Federation. The brigade is currently based at Stepnoy, Rostov Oblast.

Structure 
As of 2020, the brigade is based at Stepnoy, Rostov Oblast, in the Southern Military District. Currently, the brigade consists of:
 Brigade HQ
 Signals Company
 Support Company
 Special Weapons Company
 Logistics Unit
 Engineer Unit
 108th Spetsnaz Detachment
 173rd Spetsnaz Detachment
 305th Spetsnaz Detachment
 411th Spetsnaz Detachment

History 
It was established at Kapchagai in the Turkestan Military District on 22 July 1976. On 3 April 1978 it became a separate unit. In 1983, elements of the brigade temporarily deployed to Cuba.

Soviet-Afghan War
On 15 March 1985, it was moved to Lashkar Gah and fought in the Soviet–Afghan War. The brigade received a zone of responsibility of 1,100 km along the front and 250 km in depth towards Pakistan. Part of the brigade began fighting in April 1985, having stood in the way of caravans of weapons and drugs coming from Pakistan and Iran.

Formed in December 1986, the 411th detachment, deployed in the province of Farah, was responsible for controlling the caravan routes from Iran. In total, the 22nd brigade alone lost 199 troops in Afghanistan and killed more than 5,000 Mujahideen.

Other Conflicts
In 1989, elements of the brigade deployed to participate in the Angolan Civil War. In August 1988, the brigade moved to Pirəkəşkül in Azerbaijan and participated in the First Nagorno-Karabakh War. Elements of the brigade have participated in the Black January, the First Chechen War, where it took part in the Kizlyar-Pervomayskoye hostage crisis. The Brigade returned to participate in the Second Chechen War. 

In June 1992, the brigade moved to Stepnoy, Rostov Oblast in the Southern Military District, where it is still located today.

See also
Spetsnaz
Special Operations Forces (Russia)

References

Spetsnaz brigades of Russia
Spetsnaz brigades of the Soviet Union
Military units and formations established in 1976